Hannu (from Hannes, a diminutive of Johannes) is a Finnish first name. Notable people with the name include:

 Hannu Aravirta (born 1953), Finnish ice hockey player and an ice hockey coach
 Hannu Kaislama (born 1956), Finnish boxer
 Hannu Kamppuri (born 1957), former professional ice hockey goaltender
 Hannu Kapanen (born 1951), former Finnish ice hockey player
 Hannu Manninen (born 1978), Finnish Nordic combined athlete
 Hannu Mikkola (born 1942), retired world champion rally driver
 Hannu Patronen (born 1984), Finnish footballer
 Hannu Rajaniemi (born 1978), Finnish sci-fi author
 Hannu Salama (born 1936), Finnish author
 Hannu Siitonen (born 1949), Finnish athlete
 Hannu Taipale (born 1940), former Finnish cross country skier
 Hannu Takkula (born 1963), Finnish politician
 Hannu Tihinen (born 1976), Finnish footballer
 Hannu Toivonen (born 1984), Finnish ice hockey goaltender
 Hannu Touru (born 1952), experienced football manager
 Hannu Virta (born 1963), retired Finnish professional ice hockey defenceman
 Hannu Vitanen, fictional Finnish character from the webcomic A Redtail's dream.

See also
Hannu, ancient Egyptian explorer
Hanna (disambiguation)
Hanne
Hanni (disambiguation)
Hanno (disambiguation)

References

 

Finnish masculine given names